Ipomoea carnea, the pink morning glory, is a species of morning glory that grows as a bush. It can be easily grown from seeds. These seeds are toxic and it can be hazardous to cattle; the toxicity is related to the swainsonine produced by its endophytes, and to bioaccumulation of selenium in the leaves but mostly in the seeds.

The stem of I. carnea can be used for making paper. The plant is also of medicinal value.  It contains a component identical to marsilin, a sedative and anticonvulsant.  A glycosidic saponin has also been purified from I. carnea with anticarcinogenic and oxytoxic properties.

One selection of I. carnea, 'Inducer', has been used as a rootstock for inducing flowering of sweetpotato cultivars which otherwise prove reticent to produce flowers.

Another common name is "bush morning glory", but particularly in temperate North America, that usually refers to I. leptophylla.

In Brazil, I. carnea (in addition to other common names) is known as canudo-de-pito, literally "pipe-cane", as its hollow stems were used to make tubes for tobacco pipes. It thus became the namesake of Canudos, a religious community in the sertão of Bahia, over which the War of Canudos was fought 1893–1897.

References

External links
 'Inducer' cultivar in the USDA Germplasm System

carnea